Par Neveshteh or Parneveshteh may refer to:
 Par Neveshteh-ye Yek
 Par Neveshteh-ye Do